The 1910 North Carolina Tar Heels football team represented the University of North Carolina in the 1910 college football season. The team captain of the 1910 season was Earl Thompson.

Schedule

References

North Carolina
North Carolina Tar Heels football seasons
North Carolina Tar Heels football